Yangshan could refer to the following places in China:

Yangshan Port (洋山港), part of Port of Shanghai
Yangshan Park Station (羊山公园站), a station on the Line No. 2 of the Nanjing Metro, opened on 28 May 2010
Yangshan County (阳山县), in Guangdong
Yangshan Town
Yangshan, Chaoyang County (羊山镇), in Liaoning
Yangshan, Jinxiang County (羊山镇), in Shandong
Yangshan, Wuxi (阳山镇), in Huishan District, Wuxi, Jiangsu
Yangshan, Shengsi County (洋山镇), in Shengsi County, Zhoushan, Zhejiang
Yangshan Township
Yangshan Township, Wuwei County (羊山乡), in Wuwei County, Anhui
Yangshan Township, Wencheng County (仰山乡), in Wencheng County, Zhejiang
Yangshan Quarry (阳山碑材), an ancient stone quarry near Nanjing